The Buenos Aires Grand Prix was a motor race held in Buenos Aires, Argentina. The event was first held at the Costanera circuit from the early 1930s until 1936 and then continued in 1941 at the Retiro circuit. After a six-year break and General Juan Peron in office, racing resumed at Retiro in 1947 with the start of the South American "Temporada" Grand Prix series to be contested twice a year under Formula Libre regulations. Italian Luigi Villoresi won all 1947 Temporada events. The race regularly attracted Brazilian and European drivers and also Argentine drivers such as Juan Manuel Fangio and José Froilán González were now competing in Europe on a regular basis. For the 1948 Grand Prix season, the race was moved to the Palermo circuit where it would remain to host six of twelve "Peron Cup" races until the end of 1950. In 1951, the Costanera Norte circuit would host its last three Grand Prix events before the 1951 completion of the Autodromo 17 de Octubre (October 17), a purpose-built circuit for major Grand Prix series which would host various editions of the Buenos Aires Grand Prix from 1952 until 2009 with the exception of the 1956 event held at the General San Martin circuit in Mendoza.

 1930–1952 Argentine Formula Libre and various Sports Car Grand Prix events
 1953–1960 Formula Libre races
 1964–1968 (1978) Formula 2, Formula 3 and Formula Junior races
 1987–2009 Formula Three Sudamericana

Results

References

 
Formula One non-championship races
Pre-World Championship Grands Prix
Formula races
Recurring sporting events established in 1930